Comité Central de la Comunidad Judía de México (CCCJM) is the main Jewish community organization in Mexico. The organization has a long-standing cooperative relationship with Tribuna Israelita, an outreach group it first formed in 1944. The CCCJM is also a member of the World Jewish Congress.

History 
The organization was established in 1938 to serve as the umbrella organization for the Mexican Jewish community.

Member organizations
The CCCJM has 10 member organizations:
 La Federacion Judia de Baja California-The Jewish Federation of Baja California offering an array of services and programing. 
 Beth Israel Community Center - An English-speaking Conservative Jewish community.
 Israelite Sports Center - A Jewish sport, cultural and social institution.
 Comunidad Israelita de Monterrey - Representative body of the Jewish community of Monterrey.
 Centro Social Israelita de Baja California Norte - Representative body of the Jewish community of Tijuana.
 Ashkenazi Community Council - Founded by descendants of immigrants from Eastern Europe.
 Comunidad Bet-El de México - A Conservative Jewish community.
 Comunidad Israelita de Guadalajara - Representative body of the Jewish community of Guadalajara.
 Comunidad Maguén David - Founded by descendants of immigrants from Aleppo, Syria.
 Sociedad de Beneficencia Alliance Monte Sinai - Founded by descendants of immigrants from Damascus, Syria.
 Sephardic Community - Founded by descendants of immigrants from the Balkans.
 Comunidad Hebrea de San Miguel de Allende (CHESMA, AC) - Founded by American and Canadian ex-pats, an umbrella organization including Kehilla Shalom SMA, affiliated with USCJ. https://www.shalomsanmiguel.org/

References 

Jews and Judaism in Mexico
Jewish Mexican history
Jewish communities in Mexico
Organizations established in 1938